Carlos Andrés Lemos Romaña (born 3 June 1988) is a Colombian sprinter. He competed in the men's 4 × 400 metres relay at the 2016 Summer Olympics. He competed at the 2020 Summer Olympics.

References

1988 births
Living people
Colombian male sprinters
Olympic athletes of Colombia
Athletes (track and field) at the 2016 Summer Olympics
Place of birth missing (living people)
South American Games bronze medalists for Colombia
South American Games medalists in athletics
Competitors at the 2014 South American Games
20th-century Colombian people
21st-century Colombian people
Central American and Caribbean Games bronze medalists for Colombia
Central American and Caribbean Games medalists in athletics
Competitors at the 2014 Central American and Caribbean Games